Julius Tiranda (born in Makale, Tana Toraja, Dutch East Indies, October 13, 1936) is a sea captain from Indonesia of Torajan descent. He is renowned for his participation in a secret submarine mission by the government of Indonesia to send a submarine to Poland.

Early life 
Tiranda was born in Makale, Tana Toraja, Dutch East Indies, on October 13, 1936. He went to the Pangala Elementary School on 1945, the Torajan Junior High School on 1945. In 1950, he moved to Malang for the Malang Senior High School, on which he graduated from the school in 1953.

Military career 
Tiranda began his military career by studying at the Naval Academy in Surabaya for three years since 1954. After graduating in 1957, he was deployed in the Nanggala Submarine from 1959, and since 1964 he became the commander of the submarine.

He retired on 1965, when he was appointed as an assistant in the Coordinating Ministry for Maritime Affairs. He served there for a year, until he was later moved as the Head of the BPP Operation in Belawan. He moved again in 1974, when he was appointed as the port administrator for Palembang for 4 years, until he was finally appointed as the port administrator of Tanjung Priok in Jakarta, replacing Junus Effendi Habibie, on 16 February 1978.

Religion 
Tiranda was a Roman Catholic along with his wife.

References

Bibliography 
 

Indonesian Roman Catholics
1932 births
Living people